The Warren River is a tidal extension of the Palmer River in the U.S. state of Rhode Island. It flows approximately 6.5 km (4 mi). There are no dams along the river's length.

Course
The river begins where the Palmer River widens just over the border from Swansea. From there it flows due south between the towns of Barrington and Warren to its confluence with the Narragansett Bay.

Tributaries
Barrington River

See also
List of rivers in Rhode Island
Barrington River
Palmer River
Providence River
Narragansett Bay

References
Maps from the United States Geological Survey

Rivers of Bristol County, Rhode Island
Narragansett Bay
Rivers of Rhode Island